Macrodiplax cora, the coastal glider, also known as wandering pennant, and Cora’s pennant, is a species of dragonfly in the family Libellulidae.

Description
An adult male Macrodiplax cora is a medium-sized dragonfly (length 45mm, wingspan 75mm) with a red abdomen, dorsally marked with black patches on each segment. The female abdomen is less brightly colored. The synthorax is a brownish color and may be hirsute. The wings are clear except for a yellowish patch at the base of the hind wing. Its bi-colored legs and hourglass shaped black patches on the abdominal segments will help to easily distinguish them from other red colored dragonflies.

Distribution and habitat
The species undertakes migration and may be nomadic, and is thus widespread in tropical Asia and Australasia. It occurs in South Asia, Australia and a variety of Indian and Pacific Oceans Islands. It prefers coastal lagoons, estuaries and swamps, as it is somewhat salt-tolerant.

Gallery

See also
 List of odonates of Sri Lanka
 List of odonates of India
 List of odonata of Kerala
 List of Odonata species of Australia

References

External links

 Animal diversity web
 Query Results
 Sri Lanka Biodiversity

Libellulidae
Odonata of Oceania
Odonata of Asia
Odonata of Australia
Insects of Australia
Insects of Indonesia
Insects of Southeast Asia
Insects of India
Taxa named by Johann Jakob Kaup
Insects described in 1867